Horsham Downs is a locality about 9.5 km north of Hamilton.

Before 1906, the area was undeveloped, covered with teatree and ferns. After August 1906 sheep and cattle farms were successfully developed.

A group of protected areas, the Horsham Downs Wildlife Management Reserves, are located in Horsham Downs.

Demographics

Horsham Downs had a population of 714 at the 2018 New Zealand census, an increase of 27 people (3.9%) since the 2013 census, and an increase of 177 people (33.0%) since the 2006 census. There were 228 households, comprising 354 males and 360 females, giving a sex ratio of 0.98 males per female. The median age was 41.8 years (compared with 37.4 years nationally), with 162 people (22.7%) aged under 15 years, 111 (15.5%) aged 15 to 29, 351 (49.2%) aged 30 to 64, and 87 (12.2%) aged 65 or older.

Ethnicities were 83.6% European/Pākehā, 8.0% Māori, 1.3% Pacific peoples, 14.3% Asian, and 1.7% other ethnicities. People may identify with more than one ethnicity.

The percentage of people born overseas was 21.8, compared with 27.1% nationally.

Although some people chose not to answer the census's question about religious affiliation, 43.3% had no religion, 47.1% were Christian, 0.8% were Hindu, 1.7% were Muslim and 2.1% had other religions.

Of those at least 15 years old, 189 (34.2%) people had a bachelor's or higher degree, and 63 (11.4%) people had no formal qualifications. The median income was $47,500, compared with $31,800 nationally. 180 people (32.6%) earned over $70,000 compared to 17.2% nationally. The employment status of those at least 15 was that 303 (54.9%) people were employed full-time, 93 (16.8%) were part-time, and 15 (2.7%) were unemployed.

Education 

References

External links 
 1908 photos of house and farm
 1909 photo of wool bales on a cart

Waikato District
Populated places in Waikato
Populated places on the Waikato River